Mary Luckhurst is a writer, academic, and theatre director. She is Professor of Theatre and Performance and is the first female Head of the School of Arts at the University of Bristol. She is known for her academic and educational work in the arts in universities and the public realm and for her championing of women’s equality and human rights. She is currently working on projects about female performers who challenge the stigmas of ageing, disability and mental health.

Academic career 

Luckhurst has degrees in both arts and sciences and was educated at Cambridge University (BA (Modern Languages) and PhD (English)), Middlesex University (MA), and the London School of Economics (Msc). She spent a number of years in her twenties running a theatre company and working as a dramaturg, writer and director before deciding that she wanted to teach in the fields of theatre and arts education. She has worked in both universities and conservatoires.

A dual citizen of Britain and Australia, Luckhurst was appointed Professor and Director of Artistic Research and Creative Practice at the University of Melbourne from 2014 to 2018 on a scheme that hired in 40 world-leading academics and educators at the top of their fields. From 1998 to 2014, she was based at the University of York as their first Lecturer in Modern Drama and became the co-initiator and co-founder of the innovative Department of Theatre, Film, TV and Interactive Media. She was named as one of the 50 best teachers in the UK by the Higher Education Academy and has held distinguished visiting professorships at City University  of New York, La Trobe, Melbourne, Sydney and Oxford universities.

Selected works 
 
 On Directing, co-edited with Gabriella Giannachi (Faber & Faber, 1999; St Martin’s Press New York, 1999)
 
 On Acting, co-edited with Chloe Veltman (Faber & Faber, 2001).
 
 The Drama Handbook: A Guide to Reading Plays, co-authored with John Lennard (Oxford University Press, 2002). Arabic edition, 2009.
 
 Theatre and Celebrity in Britain 1660-2000, co-edited with Jane Moody (Palgrave, 2005).
 
 Dramaturgy: A Revolution in Theatre (Cambridge University Press, 2006). Spanish edition La Palabra que Empieza por D (Edicion Fundamentos, 2008).
 
 Blackwells Companion to Modern British and Irish Drama, 1880-2005, ed. Mary Luckhurst (Blackwells, 2006).
 
 Contemporary British and Irish Drama, co-edited with Nadine Holdsworth (Blackwells, 2008).
 
 Playing for Real: Actors on Playing Real People, co-edited with Tom Cantrell (Palgrave, 2010).
 
 Series Editor since 2004 with Professor Maggie Gale: Routledge New Perspectives on Modern and Contemporary Playwrights
 
 Theatre and Ghosts: Materiality, Performance and Modernity, co-edited with Emilie Morin (Palgrave, 2014).
 
 Caryl Churchill, (Routledge, 2015).
 
 Theatre and Human Rights After 1945: Things Unspeakable, co-edited with Emilie Morin (Palgrave, 2015).

Recent Edited Journals 

 Guest editor of special issue on ‘Actresses in 21st Century Australasia’, The Australasian Drama Studies Association Journal, no.75, 2019.
 
 Guest editor with Sandra Mayer on special issue, ‘Theatre and Persona: Performing Celebrity and Transgression’, Persona Studies Journal, vol.5., no.2, 2020.
 
 Guest editor with Matt Hargrave on special issue ‘Comedy and Combating Mental Health Stigma’, Comedy Studies, Autumn 2020.

Year of birth missing (living people)
Living people
Alumni of the London School of Economics
Alumni of New Hall, Cambridge
British theatre directors
British dramatists and playwrights
Academics of the University of York